Henderson is a surname of Scottish origin. The name is derived from patronymic form of the name Hendry, which is a Scottish form of Henry. In Scottish Gaelic it is rendered MacEanraig (masculine), and NicEanraig (feminine).

The surname Henderson is borne by numerous unrelated families in Scotland. For example, the Hendersons of Fordell, in Fife, were the chief Lowland family of the name, Clan Henderson. The Hendersons of Glencoe, a sept of Clan Donald, derive their surname from the Gaelic MacEanruig.

The surname was unknown in England prior to the 17th century and is first mentioned in a marriage document between one of the Borders Hendersons and the daughter of a Carlisle merchant at Hexham.

A
Adele Dunlap (née Henderson; 1902–2017), American academic and supercentenarian
Ainslie Henderson (born 1979), Scottish singer-songwriter
Alan Henderson (1944–2017), Northern Irish bassist for the rock band Them
Alan Henderson (born 1972), African-American basketball player
Alana Henderson, Northern Irish musician, singer, songwriter, and actress
Albert H. Henderson (1893–1951), American lawyer, politician, and judge
Alexander Henderson (disambiguation), several people including:
Alexander Henderson (American politician) (1738–1815), Scottish merchant and politician in Virginia, United States
Alexander Henderson (Canadian politician), historical Member of the Legislative Assembly of British Columbia, Canada
Alexander Henderson (theologian) (1583–1646), Scottish theologian
Alexander Henderson, 1st Baron Faringdon
 Alexander D. Henderson (businessman) (1865–1925), Vice-President and Treasurer of California Perfume Company
 Alexander D. Henderson, Jr. (1895–1964), Vice-President of Purchasing, California Perfume Company
Alice Henderson (disambiguation), one of several people including:
Alice Henderson (novelist), American author
Alice Corbin Henderson, American poet and editor
Alice Faye Henderson, African-American singer Alice Wonder Land
Alistair Donald Henderson of Fordell, Australian environmental engineer, inventor, and Chief of the Clan Henderson
Andrew Henderson (disambiguation)
Ann Henderson-Sellers, climatologist
Anthony Henderson, African-American rapper Krayzie Bone
Archibald Henderson (1783–1859), fifth Commandant of the US Marine Corps
Archibald Henderson (politician), United States Congressman from North Carolina
Arthur Henderson (disambiguation), one of several people including:
Arthur Henderson (1863–1935), British union leader, politician, and Nobel Peace Prize Laureate
Arthur Henderson (VC) (1894–1917), British Army officer
Arthur Henderson, Baron Rowley (1893–1968), British Labour Party politician

B
Barrington "Bo" Henderson, African-American singer
Barry Henderson, Conservative member of the House of Commons
Barton Henderson, Scottish curler, European champion
Biff Henderson, American television personality
Bill Henderson (curler), Scottish curler, European champion
Bill Henderson (Canadian singer), singer and songwriter
Bill Henderson (novelist) (William McCranor Henderson), American novelist, author of I Killed Hemingway
Billy Henderson (disambiguation)
Bobby Henderson, American creator of the satirical parody religion Flying Spaghetti Monsterism
Brian Henderson (disambiguation)
Brodie Henderson (rugby union), Canadian rugby player
Brodie Henderson (engineer), British civil engineer
Brooke Henderson (born 1997), Canadian golfer
Bruce Henderson, American management consultant
Bryan Henderson, American football player

C
C. J. Henderson (disambiguation), multiple people
Cam Henderson, American college sports coach
Camille Henderson, Canadian singer
Carlos Henderson, American football player
Caspar Henderson, British journalist
Charles Henderson (disambiguation), several people including:
Charles Henderson (historian), British antiquarian, historian of Cornwall
Charles Henderson Yoakum, American politician
Charles Roy Henderson, American geneticist and statistician
Charlie Butler-Henderson, British motor racing driver
Caroline Henderson (disambiguation)
Chris Henderson, American soccer player
Claude Henderson, South African cricketer

D
Dan Henderson, American martial arts fighter
Darius Henderson (born 1981), Nottingham Forest football player
Darrell Henderson (born 1997), American football player
David Henderson (disambiguation), one of several people including:
David Henderson (basketball), 1991 Israeli Basketball Premier League MVP, head basketball coach at the University of Delaware
David Henderson (British Army officer), senior British Army and, later, RAF officer
David Henderson (economist), chief economist at the OECD in Paris from 1984 to 1992
David B. Henderson, prominent U.S. politician of the 1890s and 1900s
David N. Henderson (1921–2004), U.S. Representative from North Carolina
Dave Henderson, Major League Baseball player
Dave Henderson (footballer), Irish football player
Dean Henderson (born 1997), English footballer
De'Angelo Henderson (born 1992), American football player
Sir Denys Henderson (1932–2016), chairman of Imperial Chemical Industries from 1987 to 1995
Devery Henderson, American football player
Diane Henderson, American applied mathematician
Dick Henderson, English comedian (father of Dickie Henderson)
Dickie Henderson, British comedian
Don Henderson, British actor
Donald Henderson (1928–2016), American epidemiologist who led the World Health Organization's successful World Smallpox Eradication Campaign
Donnie Henderson, American football figure
Doug Henderson (Labour politician) (born 1949), British politician
Douglas Henderson (SNP politician) (1935–2006), British politician
Douglas Mackay Henderson (1927–2007), Scottish botanist
Duke Henderson (1925–1973), American blues shouter and jazz singer

E
 Ebenezer Henderson (1784–1858), Scottish minister and missionary
 Ebenezer Henderson (writer) (1809–1879), Scottish historian and science writer
 Edith Henderson, American landscape architect
 Edith Maude Henderson, British writer better known as E. M. Hull 
 Edmonia Henderson (c.1898 or 1900–1947), American classic female blues singer
 Sir Edmund Henderson, head of London Metropolitan Police
 Edward Elers Delaval Henderson, British Army officer
 Ella Henderson, British singer
 Elsie Henderson (1880–1967), British artist
 Erica Henderson, American comic artist
 Eugénie Henderson (1914–1989), British linguist and academic

F
Faye Henderson, Scottish bagpipe player
Fergus Henderson, British chef
Fletcher Henderson (1897–1952), African-American jazz and swing musician
Florence Henderson (1934–2016), American television actress
Frank Henderson (disambiguation)
Frederick Henderson, CEO of General Motors

G
Gary Henderson (baseball coach), American college baseball coach
George Henderson (disambiguation), one of several people including:
George Henderson (Australian politician), Australian politician
George Henderson (Manitoba politician) (1916–2008), MLA in Manitoba
George Henderson (Prince Edward Island politician), former Member of Parliament in Canada
George Francis Robert Henderson (1854–1903), British soldier and military author
George R. Henderson (1893–1964), World War II-era officer in United States Navy
George Stuart Henderson (c. 1894 – 1920), recipient of the Victoria Cross
George Wylie Henderson (1904–1965), American author of the Harlem Renaissance
Georgie Henderson, New Voyage
Krazy George Henderson, American cheerleader
Gerald Henderson (born 1956), American basketball player
Gerald Henderson Jr. (born 1987), son of the above, also an American basketball player
Gerard Henderson, Australian journalist and commentator
Gilbert Henderson, Canadian sports shooter
Girard B. Henderson, CEO of Alexander Dawson, Inc.
Gordon Henderson (disambiguation), one of several people including:
Gordon Henderson (lawyer), Canadian lawyer
Gordon Henderson (politician), British Conservative Member of Parliament
Grace Henderson, American silent film and stage actress
Greg Henderson, professional New Zealand track and road racing cyclist
Greig Henderson, Scottish curler and coach, European champion
Gunnar Henderson (born 2001), American baseball player
Gus Henderson, American football coach

H
Hamish Henderson, Scottish poet
Harold Lloyd Henderson, Canadian Presbyterian minister and politician
Hazel Henderson (1933–2022), British futurist writer
Helen Anne Henderson, Canadian journalist and disability rights activist
Herb Henderson (Australian footballer), Australian rules footballer
Herbert Stephen Henderson, British soldier
Horace Henderson (1904–1988), American jazz musician, brother of Fletcher Henderson

I
Ian Henderson (disambiguation), one of several people including:
Ian Henderson (footballer), English football player
Ian Henderson (news presenter), Australian news presenter
Ian Henderson (police officer), former head of secret police in Bahrain, accused of torture
Isaac Henderson, American writer
Ivan Henderson, British politician

J
J. R. Henderson or J. R. Sakuragi (born 1976), American–Japanese basketball player
J. W. Henderson, fourth governor of Texas
Jack Henderson, artist, charity fundraiser
Jack Henderson (author)
Jackie Henderson (1932–2005), Scottish football player
James Henderson (disambiguation), one of several people including:
James Henderson (footballer, born 1867), footballer for Woolwich Arsenal
James Henderson (footballer, born 1870), footballer for Liverpool
James Pinckney Henderson, first governor of Texas
James (Sákéj) Youngblood Henderson, Indigenous law scholar
Jarlath Henderson, Irish folk musician, doctor
Jeremy Henderson (1952–2009), artist
Joe Henderson (disambiguation), one of several people including:
Joe Henderson, American jazz saxophonist
Joe Henderson (runner)
Jolene Henderson (born 1991), American softball pitcher
Joseph Henderson (pilot), early American harbor pilot
John Henderson (disambiguation), one of several people including:
John Henderson (Australian rules footballer), Australian rules footballer
John Henderson (darts player)
John Henderson (defensive tackle) (born 1979), American football player
John Henderson (director), British film and television director
John Henderson (ice hockey), Canadian ice hockey player
John Henderson (Mississippi politician) (1797–1857), U.S. senator from Mississippi
John Henderson (Conservative politician) (1888–1975), Conservative MP for Glasgow Cathcart 1946–1964
Sir John Henderson, 5th of Fordell (1605–1650), Scottish soldier who brought his military expertise to the Royalists cause during the English Civil War.
Sir John Henderson, 5th Baronet of Fordell (1752–1817), Scottish nobleman and politician
John B. Henderson (1826–1913), U.S. senator from Missouri and author of the Thirteenth Amendment to the United States Constitution
John D. Henderson ("Colonel Jack" Henderson), American editor and pro-slavery politician
John E. Henderson, American politician
John Ronald Henderson (1920–2003), British Army officer
Jordan Henderson (born 1990), English footballer
Joseph Welles Henderson, lawyer and Bucknell University president
Josh Henderson, American actor
Julian Henderson, Bishop of Blackburn

K
Karen L. Henderson, American judge
Katherine Henderson (1909—unknown), American classic female blues singer
Keith Henderson (American football), American football player
Keith Henderson (artist), Scottish painter and illustrator
Kelo Henderson (1923–2019), American film and television actor
Kelson Henderson, Australian actor
Ken Henderson (baseball coach) (born 1960), American college baseball coach
Kenneth Henderson, American politician

L
Larry Henderson, Canadian television journalist
Laura Henderson, English theatrical promoter
Lawrence Joseph Henderson, American scientist
Les Henderson, Canadian consumer-fraud author
Liam Henderson (born 1996), Scottish football player (Celtic FC, Hibernian FC)
Liam Henderson (English footballer) (born 1989), English football player (Watford FC)
Linda Dalrymple Henderson, American art historian
Lofton R. Henderson, World War II aviator
Lois T. Henderson, novelist
Lucius J. Henderson, American silent film director
Luther Henderson, American arranger
Logan Henderson (born 1989), American actor/singer

M
M. R. Henderson, Scottish botanist
Margot Henderson (born 1964), New Zealand chef
Marianne K. Henderson, American biomedical scientist
Mario Henderson  (1984–2020), American football player
Marjorie Lyman Henderson, the cartoonist Marge
Mark Henderson (disambiguation), one of several people
Marshall Henderson (born 1990), American basketball player
Martin Henderson, New Zealand actor
Mary Henderson, writer Mary H. Eastman (1818–1887)
Mary Foote Henderson, socialite and wife of Missouri Senator John Brooks Henderson
Mary H. J. Henderson (1874 –1938), World War I Scottish Women's Hospital administrator, suffragist and war poet
Mary Henderson (1919–2004), Greek-British journalist and host
Matt Henderson (disambiguation), one of several people including:
Matt Henderson (cricketer) (1895–1970), New Zealand cricketer
Matt Henderson (ice hockey) (born 1974), retired American professional ice hockey player
Meredith Henderson, Canadian actress
Michael Henderson (doctor), (born 1937), Vehicle safety researcher
Monique Henderson, American athlete
Monroe Henderson (1818–1899), New York politician

N
Nekeshia Henderson, American basketball player
Nevile Henderson, British Ambassador to Germany 1937–1939
Nicholas Henderson, British diplomat
Nicky Henderson, British racehorse trainer
Nikki Henderson, (born 1993) British yachtswoman, youngest ever skipper to lead a team in the Clipper Round the World Yacht Race

O
Othello Henderson, American football player

P
Paul Henderson (disambiguation), one of several people including:
Paul Henderson (born 1943), Canadian ice hockey player
Paul Henderson (cricketer), English cricketer
Paul Henderson (footballer) (born 1976), Australian football goalkeeper
Paul Henderson (journalist) (1939–2018), American journalist and winner of the Pulitzer Prize for Investigative Reporting in 1982
Paul Henderson (rugby union) (born 1964), New Zealand rugby union player
Peter Henderson (disambiguation), multiple people

Q
Quadree Henderson (born 1996), American football player

R
Ray Henderson (born Raymond Brost, 1896–1970)), American songwriter
Richard Henderson (disambiguation), one of several people including:
Richard Henderson (biologist) (born 1945),  Scottish molecular biologist and biophysicist 
Richard Henderson (jurist) ((1734–1785), American pioneer
 Richard Alexander Henderson (1895–1958), First World War stretcher-bearer at Gallipoli and the Somme
Rickey Henderson (born 1958), American baseball player
Robert Henderson (disambiguation), one of several people including:
Robert Henryson (c. 1425 – c. 1500), Scottish poet
Robert Henderson (Welsh cricketer) (1851–1931), English cricketer
Robert Henderson (writer) (born 1947), English political writer
Rob Henderson (born 1972), English and Irish rugby union footballer
Rosa Henderson (1896–1968), American jazz singer

S
Saffron Henderson, Canadian actress
Safiya Henderson-Holmes (1950–2001), African-American poet
Sákéj Henderson, Indigenous law scholar
Sam Henderson, American comics artist
Sammy Henderson, Scottish footballer
Sara Henderson, Australian writer
Sarah Henderson, Australian politician and former journalist
Scoot Henderson (born 2004), American basketball player
Scott Henderson, American guitarist
Scott Henderson (golfer), Scottish golfer
Sean Henderson, American soccer player
Shirley Henderson, Scottish actress
Skitch Henderson, musician and band leader
Stephen Henderson, Irish footballer
Stewart Henderson,  Scottish footballer

T
 Thelton Henderson, federal judge
 Thomas Henderson (disambiguation), one of several people including:
Thomas Henderson (American football), NFL football player
Thomas Henderson (astronomer) (1798–1844), Scottish Astronomer Royal
 Thomas Henderson (Liberal politician), Scottish Liberal Member of Parliament for Roxburghshire and Selkirkshire 1922–1923
Thomas Henderson (New Jersey politician), U.S. congressman
Thomas Henderson (New Zealand politician), New Zealand politician
 Tom Henderson (Labour politician) (1867–1960), Scottish Labour Cooperative politician
Thomas Finlayson Henderson (1844–1923), Scottish author
Thomas J. Henderson (activist), American businessman
Thomas J. Henderson (politician), United States congressman from Illinois
Tommy Henderson, Northern Ireland politician
Trayvon Henderson (born 1995), American football player
TreVeyon Henderson (born 2002), American football player

U
Ursula Henderson, South Australian politician

V
Valerie Henderson, American footballer
Vicki Butler-Henderson, British racing driver and television presenter
Virginia Henderson, American nurse

W
Wayne Henderson (disambiguation), one of several people including:
Wayne Henderson (footballer), Irish football player
Wayne Henderson (musician), American jazz trombonist
Wesley Henderson (born 1951), African American architect, historian, and educator
William Henderson (disambiguation), one of several people including:
William Henderson (American football), NFL player
William James Henderson, American music critic
William Penhallow Henderson, American painter, architect and furniture designer
William Williams Henderson, American educator

Z
Zac Henderson (1955–2020), American football player
Zenna Henderson, American author

Fictional
 Christopher Henderson (character), fictional character portrayed by Peter Weller on the television series 24
 Dustin Henderson, fictional character portrayed by Gaten Matarazzo on the Netflix science fiction horror web television series Stranger Things
 Rose Henderson (Lost), married name Nadler, character in TV series Lost
 Inspector Henderson, character from DC Comics
 General James Henderson, president of the International Astrofisical Commission from the television series UFO (his name is probably a reference to Gerry and Sylvia Anderson).
 Isaac Henderson, a character from The Mummy (1999 film)

See also
Clan Henderson
Fenderson

References

Clan Henderson
Scottish surnames
English-language surnames
Patronymic surnames
Surnames from given names